William Aiken Walker (March 11, 1839 – January 3, 1921) was an American artist best known for genre paintings of black sharecroppers. He also documented the American Civil War era during his service in the Confederate Army.

Walker was born to an Irish Protestant father and a mother of South Carolina background in Charleston, South Carolina in 1839. In 1841, after his father died, Walker's family remained in Charleston where Walker grew up. (Seibels)

In 1861, during the American Civil War, Walker was conscripted in the Confederate Army and was sent to Morris Island as part of the Palmetto Guard.  Almost immediately, Walker was sent on to Richmond and Camp Davis.  Four months later, he received a medical discharge from the army. For the remainder of the war he served as a civilian draftsman to the Confederate Engineers Corps and made maps and drawings of Charleston's defenses. (Seibels) He was separated from the military at the end of 1864. After the Civil War, Walker moved to Baltimore, where he produced small paintings of the "Old South" to sell as tourist souvenirs.

In 1868 Walker painted the ruins of the Cathedral of Saint John and Saint Finbar that burned down in December 1861 in a fire that ravaged Charleston, South Carolina.

He is best known for his paintings depicting the lives of poor black emancipated slaves, especially sharecroppers in the post-Reconstruction American South. Two of his paintings were reproduced by Currier and Ives as chromolithographs. Walker continued painting until his death on January 3, 1921, in Charleston, where he is buried in the family plot at Magnolia Cemetery.

References
 Seibels, Cynthia, The Sunny South, The Life and Art of William Aiken Walker, Spartanburg, South Carolina, Saraland Press, 1995.
 Trovaioli, August P. and Roulhac B. Toledano, William Aiken Walker, Southern Genre Painter, Baton Rouge, Louisiana State University Press, 1972.

External links
"Found art: Toledano resurrects forgotten painter"

1839 births
1921 deaths
Artists from Charleston, South Carolina
19th-century American painters
19th-century American male artists
American male painters
20th-century American painters
20th-century American male artists
American genre painters
Painters from South Carolina
People of South Carolina in the American Civil War
Painters from Maryland
Artists from Baltimore
Burials in South Carolina